The 1992 Ottawa Rough Riders finished 3rd place in the East Division with a 9–9 record. They were defeated in the East Semi-Final by the Hamilton Tiger-Cats.

Offseason

CFL draft

Preseason

Regular season

Season standings

Regular season

Schedule

Postseason

Awards and honours
CFL's Most Outstanding Offensive Lineman Award – Robert Smith (OG)

1992 CFL All-Stars
WR – Stephen Jones, CFL All-Star
OT – Robert Smith, CFL All-Star
LB – Angelo Snipes, CFL All-Star
CB – Less Browne, CFL All-Star
DB – Anthony Drawhorn, CFL All-Star

References

Ottawa Rough Riders seasons